Sophronius II briefly served as Greek Patriarch of Alexandria in 941.

References

10th-century Patriarchs of Alexandria